Gjøa oilfield is an oilfield in the Norwegian section of the North Sea.

The oil field was discovered in 1989 and the development was announced in December 2006. It was developed by the consortium of  Statoil, ENGIE, Petoro, Royal Dutch Shell and RWE Dea. During the development phase, the operator of the field was Statoil. Once production began in 2010 ENGIE took over the operatorship. The field came on stream in November 2010, and it reached plateau production in 2013.  The total investment is about 27 billion Norwegian kroners. In 2018 A/S Norske Shell sold its interest to Norwegian SA OKEA.

Produced gas is transported through the FLAGS pipeline to the St Fergus Gas Terminal in Scotland. Gjøa is connected to the FLAGS pipeline through the   link built by Saipem.  The linking pipeline was laid by the Castoro Sei vessel.  Oil is exported through the   link to the Troll II trunkline, and onwards to the Mongstad Refinery north of Bergen.
The gas field came on stream in November 2010.

Gjøa semi-submersible floating production platform is also linked with the Vega and Vega South fields development.

Gjøa semi-submersible floating production platform was designed by Aker Solutions Engineering in 2006–2010.

References

Engie oil and gas fields
Equinor oil and gas fields
Natural gas fields in Norway
North Sea oil fields
Oil fields in Norway
Shell plc oil and gas fields